Happy Halloween, Scooby-Doo!  is a 2020 American direct-to-DVD animated comedy horror film, and the thirty-fourth entry in the direct-to-video series of Scooby-Doo films. It was released on October 6, 2020, by Warner Bros. Home Entertainment.

Plot 
The Mystery Inc. gang are in a covert operation in Elvira's Halloween of Horrors Parade in Crystal Cove to capture the Haunted Scarecrow. The gang unmasks the Haunted Scarecrow as Dr. Jonathan Crane a.k.a. the Scarecrow, a former escapee convict of Arkham Asylum. While Velma explains how she solved the mystery by tracing a fan mail sent to Elvira by Crane and measuring gas leakage in the air, gas drones carrying fear gas canisters set up by Crane appears in the sky. As everyone starts panicking, Scooby-Doo and Shaggy shoot down the drones by using Halloween candies as projectiles. Before being pulled away by the federal agents, Dr. Crane tells Velma that his drones did not leak, thereby giving a hint that she missed something in her reasoning. Nevertheless, the mystery gang is hailed as heroes by everyone, including the Sheriff for drawing an end to the hauntings.

The gang finds out that the Mystery Machine was severely damaged while chasing Dr. Crane and Fred is visibly upset. Meanwhile, Scooby and Shaggy go to trick or treat as they think the mystery is solved. On the way, they come across a stray disabled drone in a pumpkin patch with "Tot Alli Frame" engraved on it and a truck full of toxic waste. The pumpkins coming in contact with the mixture of toxic waste and Dr. Crane's fear formula turn to animated monsters. Smaller pumpkins start flying and starts chasing Scooby and Shaggy. They quickly return to town and interrupt an ongoing interview of the other Mystery Inc. gang members to inform them about the 'Jackal Lanterns' of the pumpkin patch. Unfortunately, nobody seems to believe them, and they are chided for their actions by Velma.

Fred and Velma are approached by Bill Nye, who gifts them a modernized vehicle named 'Mystery Machine X'. Fred is not so enthusiastic about it as he prefers the old Mystery Machine. The Jackal Lanterns then come into the town and takes a female reporter with them. As Fred and Velma reach her, they see her being eaten and spit out by the Jackal Lanterns' giant master to become another monster herself. The Jackal Lanterns start chasing everybody, resulting in a long car chase. The gang becomes separated into three groups: Fred, Velma, and Bill Nye in Mystery Machine X, Daphne and Elvira in Elvira's car, and Shaggy and Scooby with a father-daughter duo called Mike and Michelle. They come across the Sheriff, who freaks out and is gobbled up by the Giant Jackal Lantern, who is riding on the old Mystery Machine. Velma frees Dr. Crane from the federal agents' truck, but he too is apparently eaten by the Giant Jackal Lantern. This results in the Mystery Machine being destroyed, much to Fred's depression.

The Mystery Inc. gang comes together with Elvira, Mike, and Michelle and eats Scooby-Snacks to enter Velma's mind palace, an imaginary plane where they recount the night's events. Velma takes a leap of faith where she enters the Giant Jackal Lantern's mouth and comes out unharmed. As it turns out, the Giant Jackal Lantern is actually just a machine and everyone eaten are safe inside. The rest of the Jackal Lanterns are revealed drones, though both the Sheriff and Dr. Crane are missing. The drone engraving found by Scooby and Shaggy is revealed to be "T.O.T. Aluminum Lithium Frame". The culprit is eventually revealed to be Toe Omnitech head Cutler Toe, whose criminal actions was exposed by Mystery Inc. in the past and has been impersonating the Sheriff as part of a revenge plot against them while also after the lithium mine under Crystal Cove after being released from jail. Velma and Daphne find out his location by trailing a hologram of the Jackal Lanterns and help the federal agents find his car. But the escaped Scarecrow, in vengeance for Toe attempting to frame him for the Jackal Lantern attacks, had found Toe first and no trace of either men are found. With everything resolved and the gang being invited to another roadside Halloween celebration, the movie ends with Elvira giving a monologue to the viewers before breaking the fourth wall by revealing a spidery face behind her regular face in an ode to Halloween.

During the credits, the gang (including Bill Nye) helps Fred rebuild the Mystery Machine from what happened earlier in the film.

Cast 
 Frank Welker as Scooby-Doo, Fred Jones
 Matthew Lillard as Shaggy Rogers
 Kate Micucci as Velma Dinkley
 Grey Griffin as Daphne Blake
 Cassandra Peterson as Elvira
 Bill Nye as himself
 Dwight Schultz as Dr. Jonathan Crane/The Scarecrow
 David Herman as Cutler Toe/Sheriff
 Kamali Minter as Michelle
 Bumper Robinson as Mike
 Roger Craig Smith as Autopilot, Parent
 Fred Tatasciore as Jackal Lanterns, Federal Agent Malarkey

Production 
On July 5, 2020, Syfy announced the film with the debut of a trailer. It was directed by Maxwell Atoms (and therefore includes a style of humor similar to that of The Grim Adventures of Billy and Mandy) with Sam Register as producer.

References

External links 
 
 

2020s English-language films
2020s American animated films
2020s children's animated films
Films based on television series
Warner Bros. Animation animated films
Warner Bros. direct-to-video animated films
2020 direct-to-video films
2020 animated films
2020 films
Films about Halloween
Films directed by Maxwell Atoms
American children's animated mystery films
American children's animated comedy films
American mystery films
Scooby-Doo direct-to-video animated films
American direct-to-video films
American comedy horror films
American films about Halloween
Films produced by Sam Register
2020 comedy films
English-language comedy horror films